A Night at the Grand Hotel is a 1931 German drama film directed by Max Neufeld and starring Mártha Eggerth, Ulrich Bettac, and Kurt Gerron. It was shot at the Johannisthal Studios in Berlin. The film's sets were designed by the art director Ernö Metzner. A separate French version  was also released.

Cast

References

Bibliography

External links 
 

1931 films
1931 drama films
Films of the Weimar Republic
German drama films
1930s German-language films
Films directed by Max Neufeld
Films set in hotels
German black-and-white films
German multilingual films
Bavaria Film films
1931 multilingual films
1930s German films
Films shot at Johannisthal Studios